Rautavaara is a municipality of Finland.

Rautavaara may also refer to:
"Rautavaara's Case", a 1980 science fiction short story by Philip K. Dick
Rautavaara Airfield, an airfield in Rautavaara, Finland

People with the surname
Einojuhani Rautavaara (1928–2016), Finnish composer
Tapio Rautavaara (1915–1979), Finnish athlete, singer and actor